Ídolos Portugal (season 1) was the first season of Ídolos. Nuno Norte won over Ricardo Oliveira.

Finals

Finalists
(ages stated at time of contest)

Live show details

Heat 1 (3 October 2003)

Notes
Nuno Norte, David Cruz and Dércio Moreira advanced to the top 10 of the competition. The other 7 contestants were eliminated.
Diana Lucas returned for a second chance at the top 10 in the Wildcard Round.

Heat 2 (10 October 2003)

Notes
Ricardo Oliveira, Bruna Andrade and Carla Sofia advanced to the top 10 of the competition. The other 7 contestants were eliminated.
Luísa Sobral and Rui Andrade returned for a second chance at the top 10 in the Wildcard Round.

Heat 3 (17 October 2003)

Notes
Rita Silva, Mariline Hortigueira and Débora Gonçalves advanced to the top 10 of the competition. The other 7 contestants were eliminated.
Andreia Machado, Emanuel Pereira, Nádia Pimentel and Rúben Patrício returned for a second chance at the top 10 in the Wildcard Round.

Wildcard round (24 October 2003)

Notes
Luísa Sobral received the highest number of votes, and completed the top 10.

Live Show 1 (7 November 2003)
Theme: My Idol

Live Show 2 (14 November 2003)
Theme: Film Hits

Live Show 3 (21 November 2003)
Theme: My Parents' Idol

Live Show 4 (28 November 2003)
Theme: Latin American Songs

Live Show 5 (5 December 2003)
Theme: Portuguese Songs

Live Show 6 (12 December 2003)
Theme: Songs of My Childhood

Live Show 7 (19 December 2003)
Theme: Christmas Songs

Live Show 8: Semi-final (26 December 2003)
Theme: Judges' Choice

Live final (2 January 2004)

External links
Official Website via Web Archive

Ídolos (Portuguese TV series)
2003 Portuguese television seasons
2004 Portuguese television seasons